Yunnanilus paludosus is a species of stone loach endemic to China. This species is endemic to the endorheic drainage system which feeds the Datangzi Marsh in Luoping County, Yunnan, The specific name paludosus means "marshy", referring to the habitat of the type locality, Datangzi Marsh.

References

P
Taxa named by Maurice Kottelat
Taxa named by Chu Xin-Luo
Fish described in 1988